Lukas Herburger (born 19 December 1994) is an Austrian handball player for Kadetten Schaffhausen and the Austrian national team.

He participated at the 2018 European Men's Handball Championship.

References

External links

1994 births
Living people
People from Bregenz
Austrian male handball players
Expatriate handball players
Austrian expatriate sportspeople in Switzerland
Sportspeople from Vorarlberg